Lazare is the French and Georgian form of the given name Lazarus, which is itself derived from the Hebrew name Eleazar. It is also a surname.

Lazare may refer to:

Given name
 Lazare de Baïf (1496–1547), French diplomat and humanist
 Lazare Bruandet (1755–1803), French landscape painter
 Lazare Carnot (1753–1823), French mathematician, physicist and politician known as the "Organizer of Victory" in the French Revolutionary and Napoleonic Wars
 Lazare Hippolyte Carnot (1801–1888), French politician, son of the above
 Lazare Escarguel (1816–1893), French politician and newspaper editor
 Lazare Gianessi (1925–2009), French footballer
 Lazare Hoche (1768–1797), French general
 Lazare Kupatadze (born 1996), Georgian football player
 Lazare Lévy (1882–1964), French pianist, organist, composer and pedagogue
 Lazare Ponticelli (1897–2008), last surviving French veteran of the First World War
 Lazare Saminsky (1882–1959), Russian performer, conductor and composer, especially of Jewish music
 Lazare Sèhouéto (born 1963), Beninese politician
 Lazare Weiller (1858–1928), French engineer, industrialist and politician

Surname
 Bernard Lazare (1865–1903), French literary critic, political journalist, anarchist and polemist
 Emmanuel Mzumbo Lazare (1864–1929), African-Trinidadian lawyer and social activist
 Jean Thierry Lazare (born 1998), Ivorian footballer
 Mylène Lazare (born 1987), French swimmer

Stage name
 Lars Nedland (born 1976), known as Lazare, Norwegian musician and co-founder of the metal band Solefald

French masculine given names